Jacob Morris (born 12 May 2000) is an English rugby union player who plays for Gloucester in the Premiership Rugby.

References

External links
Gloucester Profile
ESPN Profile
Ultimate Rugby Profile

2000 births
Living people
English rugby union players
Rugby union players from Cheltenham
Rugby union wings